The World Figure Skating Championships is an annual figure skating competition sanctioned by the International Skating Union in which figure skaters compete for the title of World Champion.

Men's and pairs' competitions took place from 13 to 14 February in Berlin, Germany. Ladies' competitions took place from 7 to 8 February in Stockholm, Sweden.

Results

Men

Judges:
 Herbert J. Clarke 
 P. Engelhard 
 Walter Jakobsson 
 Fritz Kachler 
 René Japiot

Ladies

Judges:
 Ludwig Fänner 
 Hugo Metzner 
 Tore Mothander 
 Walter Jakobsson 
 O. R. Kolderup

Pairs

Judges:
 Yngvar Bryn 
 René Japiot 
 E. Query 
 Hugo Winzer 
 Fritz Kachler 
 Walter Jakobsson 
 Herbert J. Clarke

Sources
 Result list provided by the ISU

World Figure Skating Championships
World Figure Skating Championships
World 1926
World 1926
World Figure Skating Championships, 1926
World Figure Skating Championships, 1926
1920s in Berlin
1926 in Swedish sport
February 1926 sports events
1920s in Stockholm
Sports competitions in Berlin